Cyperus picardae is a species of sedge that is endemic to Hispaniola.

The species was first formally described by the botanist Johann Otto Boeckeler in 1895.

See also 
 List of Cyperus species

References 

picardae
Taxa named by Johann Otto Boeckeler
Plants described in 1895
Flora of Hispaniola
Flora without expected TNC conservation status